The grey-winged cotinga (Lipaugus conditus) is a species of bird in the family Cotingidae. It is endemic to Brazil where it is restricted to the Serra dos Órgãos and Serra do Tinguá in Rio de Janeiro State. Its natural habitat is tropical moist montane forest.

This species was formerly placed in the genus Tijuca. A molecular phylogenetic study published in 2014 found the Tijuca was embedded within the genus Lipaugus.  Based on this result Tijuca was subsumed into Lipaugus.

References

External links
BirdLife Species Factsheet.

Lipaugus
Birds of the Atlantic Forest
Endemic birds of Brazil
Birds described in 1980
Taxonomy articles created by Polbot